Peene-Werft is a German shipyard with headquarter and shipbuilding facilities in Wolgast. It has been part of the Bremen Lürssen Group since May 2013.

Background 
The shipyard was founded on 20 June 1948 by the Soviet military administration. Initially, cutters and coasters were built as reparations for the Soviet Union. In 1951 the construction of naval ships began. Until the fall of the Berlin Wall, mainly light torpedo speedboats (LTS boats) and minesweepers in short and long form (the state yacht Ostseeland is based on this model), landing ships and submarine hunters for the People's Navy and for the Soviet Union were built. In principle, almost the entire fleet of the Volksmarine came from the Peene shipyard. In the late 1970s, a number of sea bucket chain dredgers were keeled for the USSR. In addition, in the 1980s, small cabin boats with internal combustion engines were produced as part of the “consumer goods production” prescribed by the party. The shipyard was a state-owned enterprise in the shipbuilding combine of the GDR. The number of employees in 1989 was around 2,900.

2010s 
On June 7, 2010, the shipyard was realigned; the merger of Volkswerft Stralsund GmbH and Peene-Werft GmbH resulted in P+S Werften GmbH. The shareholders were the Hegemann Group with around seven percent stake and HSW Treuhand and Beteiligungsgesellschaft mbH with around 93 percent. The number of employees was around 750 in 2012.

According to the Ostsee-Zeitung, the managing director of P+S Werften GmbH, Dieter Brammertz, declared in March 2012 that there would probably be no more shipbuilding in Wolgast; the Peene would be too small to build larger ships, and the company would rely on the construction of sub-parts for offshore wind turbines, so-called jackets. In August 2012, P+S Werften GmbH filed for bankruptcy.

In December 2012, the Wolgast shipyard was taken over for around 17 million euros by the Lürssen Group from Bremen, which relocated the construction of two foreships for the Baden-Württemberg-class frigates of the German Navy to Wolgast. In the takeover proceedings after the bankruptcy of P+S Werften GmbH, Abu Dhabi MAR (ADM) also signaled its interest.

At the beginning of September 2013, a new flame cutting center for the construction of ships for the foreign and German navy was put into operation at the shipyard. There are i.a. an order to build 30 patrol boats, each 35–40 meters long, for Saudi Arabia. An export ban was imposed on the patrol boats in November 2018, as a result of which the shipyard had to register short-time work for a large part of the workforce.

2020s 
At the beginning of November 2020, Lürssen confirmed the delivery of ten coast guard boats to Egypt. The boats are designed for domestic coastal protection tasks. These are, for example, the protection of sensitive offshore installations, the prevention of smuggling, the containment of piracy and sea rescue.

Naval ships 
Naval ships built by Penne-Werft include:

 Kondor-class minesweeper
 Hai-class submarine hunter
 Krake-class mine-warfare vessel
 Jugend-class supply ship
 Ohre-class accommodation ship
 Berlin-class replenishment ship
 Parchim-class corvette
Baden-Württemberg-class frigate

References 

Companies established in 1948
Military vehicle manufacturers
German boat builders
Shipbuilding companies of Germany
Defence companies of Germany
German brands
1948 establishments in Germany
Companies of East Germany